Overview of Georgian Airways served destinations.

February 2022: Due to bankruptcy and restructuring proceedings as of December 31, 2021, and the corona pandemic which saw Georgian airspace closed for nearly a year, the route network of Georgian Airways has been radically slashed. There are not many "independent secondary" sources to confirm the remaining flights, and they do not necessarily reflect reality in the air.

List
As of April 2022, Georgian Airways has scheduled services to the following destinations:

Past destinations:

References 

Georgian Airways